Fan Guobin (born 23 April 1958) is a Chinese engineer at China Academy of Engineering Physics, and an academician of the Chinese Academy of Engineering.

Biography 
Fan was born into a military family in  Beijing, on 23 April 1958. He attended Deyu Primary School. He elementary and secondary studied at the First Middle School of Changsha. After resuming the college entrance examination, he was accepted to National University of Defense Technology, where he graduated in 1982. He earned his doctor's degree from Xidian University in 2005.

After graduating in 1982, he was despatched to the China Academy of Engineering Physics. On 17 January 2019, he was engaged by Southwest University of Science and Technology as honorary dean of the School of Economics and Management.

Honours and awards 
 1997 State Science and Technology Progress Award (Second Class)
 2009 State Science and Technology Progress Award (First Class)
 2011 State Science and Technology Progress Award (Second Class)
 2014 State Science and Technology Progress Award (First Class)
 27 November 2017 Member of the Chinese Academy of Engineering (CAE)

References 

1958 births
Living people
Engineers from Beijing
National University of Defense Technology alumni
Xidian University alumni
Members of the Chinese Academy of Engineering